The Strasbourg massacre occurred on 14 February 1349, when several hundred Jews were publicly burnt to death, and the rest of them expelled from the city as part of the Black Death persecutions. 

Starting in the spring of 1348, pogroms against Jews had occurred in European cities, starting in Toulon. By November of that year they spread via Savoy to German-speaking territories. In January 1349, burnings of Jews took place in Basel and Freiburg, and on 14 February the Jewish community in Strasbourg was destroyed.

This event was heavily linked to a revolt by the guilds five days previously, the consequences of which were the displacement of the master tradesmen, a reduction of the power of the patrician bourgeoisie, who had until then been ruling almost exclusively, and an increase in the power of the groups that were involved in the revolt. The aristocratic families of Zorn and Müllenheim, which had been displaced from the council and their offices in 1332, recovered most of their power. The guilds, which until then had no means of political participation, could occupy the most important position in the city, that of the Ammanmeister. The revolt had occurred because a large part of the population on the one hand believed the power of the master tradesmen was too great, particularly that of the then-Ammanmeister Peter Swarber, and on the other hand, there was a desire to put an end to the policy of protecting Jews under Peter Swarber.

Causes

Anti-Semitism in the population 
The causes of the increased anti-semitism are easy to make out. Its development found fertile territory in the religious and social resentments against Jews that had grown deeper over the centuries (with allegations such as host desecration, blood libel, and deicide).

Through their role as money-lenders, one of the few roles available to Jews, who were forbidden by local and often canon law, to own land or to be farmers, the Jews took an important position in the city's economy. However, this brought serious problems. The chroniclers report that the Jews were criticised for their business practices: they were said to be so arrogant that they were unwilling to grant anyone else precedence, and those who dealt with them, could hardly come to an agreement with them. This supposed ruthlessness of the Jews did not, however, derive from any particular hard-heartedness, but was rather due to the huge levies and taxes that they were made to pay, mostly in exchange for protection. Formally, the Jews still belonged to the King's chamber, but he had long since ceded these rights to the city (the confirmation of the relevant rights of the city by Charles IV occurred in 1347). Strasbourg therefore took in the most part of the Jews' taxes, but in exchange had to take over their protection (the exact amount of the taxes was determined by written agreements). In order to satisfy the city's demands, the Jews therefore had to do business accordingly, but in doing so further increased the population's, and certainly the debtors', anti-Semitism.

With the threat of Black Death, there were also accusations of well poisoning, and some who now openly called for the burning of Jews.

The government's policy of protecting Jews 
Unlike the majority of the population, the council and the master tradesmen remained committed to the policy of protecting the Jews and attempted to calm the people and prevent a pogrom. The Catholic clergy had been advised by two papal bulls of Pope Clement VI the previous year (July and September 1348) to preach against anyone accusing the Jews of poisoning wells as "seduced by that liar, the Devil."

Tactical measures 
At first the council tried to rebut the claims of well poisoning by initiating court proceedings against a number of Jews and torturing them. As expected, they did not confess to the crimes. Despite this, they were still killed on the breaking wheel. Furthermore, the Jewish quarter was sealed off and guarded by armed persons, in order to protect the Jews from the population and possible over-reactions. The master tradesmen wanted to maintain the legal process with respect to the Jews; in their situation in which they themselves increasingly came under attack, this was a matter of self-preservation and holding on to power. A pogrom could easily escalate and turn into an uncontrollable revolt of the people. How seriously this threat of revolt was taken is shown by a letter from the city council of Cologne on 12 January 1349 to the leaders of Strasbourg, which warned that such riots by the common people had led to much evil and devastation in other towns. Furthermore, this unrest could give the opponents the possibility of taking power themselves. The bourgeoisie had after all come to occupy the leading political positions in a similar way, when they had used the dispute between the Zorn and Müllenheim noble families to their advantage.

The duty to protect the Jews 

As the de facto master over the Jews, the city had a duty to protect them, especially since they paid significant amounts of money in exchange for this. Peter Swarber also pointed to this: the city had collected the money and had given in return a guarantee for their security—with a letter and a seal. The city must fulfill this duty towards the Jews. He, therefore could not and would not agree to an extermination of the Jews, a stance in which he was undoubtedly strengthened by the fear of the adverse effects on the economic development of the city. A weakening of the city would also mean a weakening of the patrician bourgeoisie, which was reliant on stable political conditions and a healthy city economy for their long-distance trade. The Jews especially had a vital role to play in this: people depended on their credit for large-scale investments, their supra-regional role as bankers ensured a positive balance of trade for Strasbourg, and they filled the city coffers through the taxes they paid. There were reasons enough, therefore, to remain attached to the policy of protecting the Jews.

Overthrow 
The motivations of the master tradesmen were concealed from the people of Strasbourg. Instead, they thought another reason far more likely: there were rumours that the master tradesmen had allowed themselves to be bribed by the Jews, which was why they were protecting them so determinedly against the will of the majority. It was therefore seen as important to first remove the masters from power, which would allow the majority to push through the will of the people.

Rebellion of the artisans 
The chronicles have delivered a detailed overview of the process of the displacement of the masters. On Monday 9 February, the artisans gathered in front of the cathedral and, in front of the crowd, informed the masters that they would not allow them to remain in office anymore, as they had too much power. This action appears to have been organised beforehand among the guilds, since they had their guild banners with them and also appeared organised by guilds. The masters attempted to persuade the artisans to break up  the assembled crowd—without success—but made no moves to comply with the rebels' demands. The artisans, after an exhaustive debate which involved not only the guilds' representatives but also the most eminent of the knights and citizens, decided to make a new attempt. It now became finally clear to the masters that they had no support any more, and so they gave up their posts. One craftsman became Ammanmeister, namely "Betscholt der metziger." The guilds had thereby attained their goal: the last obstacle to their demand of destroying the Jews was pushed aside, and they now had increased possibilities of participating in town politics. This had previously been denied to them, although in 1332 they had helped the bourgeois patricians to get a position of power.

Organisers of the coup 
The noble families of Zorn and Müllenheim, who had been forced from power at that time, tried to regain their old position of power, but in order to do this they had to cooperate with the guilds. In the chronicles, this cooperation comes across again and again: the noble families brought their weapons at the same time as the craftsmen when the latter assembled before the cathedral, they were involved with the debates during the rebellion, and it was noblemen who put the demands to the masters, in the name of the artisans. The nobles cooperated not only with the guilds, but also with the Bishop of Strasbourg. This is proved by a meeting which took place one day before the rebellion and which concerned the "Jewish issue." This meeting can only have revolved around the method of getting rid of the Jews; the fact that they had to go had already been decided a month previously. On that occasion, the Strasbourg bishop, representatives of the cities of Strasbourg, Freiburg and Basel, and Alsatian local rulers met in Benfeld, in order to plan their actions towards the Jews. Peter Swarber was in fact aware of this agreement by the bishop and Alsatian nobles, which is why he warned: if the bishop and the nobles were successful against him in the "Jewish issue", they would not rest until they were also successful in other cases. But he was not able to dissuade from the anti-Jewish stance.

Result of the coup 
Through the coup, the old noble families regained a great deal of their former power, the guilds regained their political participation, and many expected an anti-Semitic policy from the new political leadership (whereas between 1332 and 1349 not one nobleman had held the office of a master, now two of four town masters were nobles). The demand to reduce the power of the masters was also granted. The old masters were punished (the town masters were banned from election to the council for 10 years, the hated Peter Swarber was banished, his assets confiscated), the council was dissolved and reconstituted in the next three days, and the pogrom began a day later.

The pogrom 
The new rulers of the city did not care about either the contract of protection with the Jews nor the financial losses for the city which resulted from the pogrom. The two deposed officials were left with the task of leading the Jews to the place of their execution, pretending to lead them out of Strasbourg. At this place, a wooden house had been built in which the Jews were burnt alive. Those Jews who were willing to get baptized as well as children and any women considered attractive were spared from the burning alive. The massacre is said to have lasted six days.

Result 
After getting rid of the Jews, the murderers distributed the properties among themselves, which suggests another motive for the murders. By killing the Jews, the debtors had the opportunity to restore themselves, which they used consistently. Many of those who promoted the overthrow were in debt of the Jews, and this shows the connection between the overthrow of the master tradesmen and the pogrom. Apart from Strasbourg nobles and citizens, Bishop Berthold von Buchegg was also indebted to the Jews, as were several of the landed gentry, even some sovereign princes such as the Margrave of Baden and the Count of Württemberg. The cash of the Jews was divided among the artisans by decision of the council, maybe as a sort of "reward" for their support in overthrowing the master tradesmen. This had probably been promised to the craftsmen in advance, and the prospect of a share of the Jews' fortune may have motivated them even more to murder.

Securing Jewish property 
After the distribution of the loot among the citizenry had been decided, they had to ensure that this would not be reclaimed by anyone. For King Charles IV started to play politics with the Strasbourg Jewish legacy, by granting large-scale debt repayments for Jews. It is possible that the few Strasbourg Jews who were still alive also wanted to redeem their rights to the property. Counter-measures were therefore decided. Strasbourg made an alliance on 5 June 1349 with the bishop and the Alsatian rural nobility: the city would offer aid in times of war and promised to give back all bonds, and received the assurance that the bishop and nobles would support Strasbourg against anyone wanting to hold it to account for the murder of the Jews and confiscation of their assets. The Strasbourg council demanded that its allies should also take action against the Jews. In fact, it even tried to force those towns and nobles who did not do so to take action via the Landfrieden. With these measures, Strasbourg managed to retain complete control of the Jewish assets. In a deed of 12 July 1349, Charles IV also gave up his claims.

Political dimension of the massacre in the Empire 
In the Late Middles Ages, Strasbourg was the most important city on the Upper Rhine. Since it had rid itself of rule by the bishop in 1262, the city was autonomous and effectively enjoyed Imperial immediacy. Thus, the throne disputes between the House of Luxembourg (with Charles IV) and the House of Wittelsbach (with Louis IV (until 1347) and Günther von Schwarzburg) also played out on the level of city politics, inasmuch as both sides tried to form alliances. The bourgeois-patrician leadership was on the Wittelsbachs' side until Louis' death, after which they supported Charles IV, the city's nobility on the other hand now supported Günther von Schwarzburg.

The contrasts of both groups are also reflected in the throne dispute. Through this, the Schutzjuden ("protected Jews") became a politically misused power instrument. The disputes brought huge costs, which were partly offset by selling of the royal rights concerning the Jews. Thus a curious situation came about in Strasbourg that the kingdom's Jewish right had been given by the rivals to different individuals (Charles IV sold it on 12 December 1347 to the Count of Öttingen, Günther sold it on 2 January 1349 to the Counts of Katzenelnbogen). Therefore there was now legal uncertainty, as it was not clear who was responsible for protecting the Jews.

See also 
 History of Jews in Alsace
 Basel massacre
 Black Death Jewish persecutions

References 

14th-century massacres
Medieval anti-Jewish pogroms
1340s in the Holy Roman Empire
1349 in Europe
History of Strasbourg
Conflicts in 1349
Epidemic riots
Black Death